Selmir dos Santos Bezerra (born August 23, 1979 in Fortaleza, Brasil) is a Brazilian footballer who plays for Atlético Tubarão. He plays as a forward. Selmir is 182 cm tall and weighs 86 kg.

Selmir made his professional debut in 1997 for Central. Selmir has played for various clubs throughout his career. He also played for K-League sides Incheon United, Daegu FC, Chunnam Dragons and Daejeon Citizen. Selmir is Brazilian, but is yet to win any international caps for the Brazil national squad.

Club career 
1997  Central
1997-1998  Vitória SC
1998-1999  Felgueiras
1999-2000  Os Sandinenses
2001  Joinville
2001-2002  Figueirense
2003  Atlético Paranaense
2003  Hapoel Be'er Sheva
2004  Paysandu
2004  Bahia
2005  Pohang Steelers
2005  Incheon United
2006  Atlético Paranaense
2006  Incheon United
2006  Chunnam Dragons
2007  Daegu FC
2008  Botafogo-RJ
2008  Guarani
2008  Daejeon Citizen
2009  Botafogo-SP
2009  ABC
2010  Sampaio Corrêa
2011  Concórdia
2011  Grêmio Barueri
2011  Metropolitano
2011  Red Bull Brasil
2012–present  Atlético Tubarão

Club Honors 
Campeonato Paranaense, 2001
Campeonato Catarinense, 2001 & 2002
Copa Sesquicentenário, 2003

External links
 
 

1979 births
Living people
Association football forwards
Brazilian footballers
Brazilian expatriate footballers
Vitória S.C. players
F.C. Felgueiras players
Joinville Esporte Clube players
Figueirense FC players
G.D.R.C. Os Sandinenses players
Club Athletico Paranaense players
Hapoel Be'er Sheva F.C. players
Paysandu Sport Club players
Esporte Clube Bahia players
Pohang Steelers players
Incheon United FC players
Jeonnam Dragons players
Daegu FC players
Botafogo Futebol Clube (SP) players
Guarani FC players
Daejeon Hana Citizen FC players
Sampaio Corrêa Futebol Clube players
Grêmio Barueri Futebol players
Red Bull Brasil players
Primeira Liga players
K League 1 players
Expatriate footballers in Portugal
Expatriate footballers in Israel
Expatriate footballers in South Korea
Sportspeople from Fortaleza
Brazilian expatriate sportspeople in Portugal
Brazilian expatriate sportspeople in South Korea